Haney Hill is a summit in Ste. Genevieve County in the U.S. state of Missouri.

Haney Hill has the name of Sam Haney, a pioneer settler.

References

Landforms of Ste. Genevieve County, Missouri
Hills of Missouri